The Review of Economic Dynamics is a quarterly peer-reviewed academic journal published by Elsevier on behalf of the Society for Economic Dynamics. It covers dynamic models from all areas of economics. The editor-in-chief is Matthias Doepke (Northwestern University).

Abstracting and indexing 
The journal is abstracted and indexed in RePEc, Scopus, Social Sciences Citation Index, and Current Contents/Social & Behavioral Sciences. According to the Journal Citation Reports, the journal has a 2013 impact factor of 1.746.

See also 
List of economics journals

References

External links
 

Economics journals
Elsevier academic journals
Quarterly journals
English-language journals
Publications established in 1996